The 1969–70 Japan Ice Hockey League season was the fourth season of the Japan Ice Hockey League. Five teams participated in the league, and the Oji Seishi Hockey won the championship.

Regular season

External links
 Japan Ice Hockey Federation

Japan
Ice hockey
Ice hockey
Japan Ice Hockey League seasons
Japan